Reveal or Revealed may refer to:

People
 Reveal (rapper) (born 1983), member of the British hip hop group Poisonous Poets
 James L. Reveal (1941–2015), American botanist

Arts, entertainment, and media

Literature
 Revealed, a 2013 novel in the House of Night series by P. C. and Kristin Cast 
 Revealed (Margaret Peterson Haddix novel)), a novel by Margaret Peterson Haddix
 The Revealers, a 2003 children's novel by Doug Wilhelm

Music

Labels
 Reveal Records, a UK record label
 Revealed Recordings, a Dutch record label created by Hardwell

Albums
 Reveal (Fischer-Z album), 1987
 Reveal (R.E.M. album), 2001
 Reveal, by Future Leaders of the World, 2015
 Reveal (The Boyz album), by The Boyz, 2020
 Revealed (Deitrick Haddon album), 2008
 Revealed (Pink Floyd album), 1973
 Revealed – Live in Dallas, a 2010 album by Myron Butler & Levi
 Revealing (album), a 1977 album by James Blood Ulmer

Songs
 "Dissolve/Reveal", a 1984 song by Tom Verlaine from Cover
 "Revealed", a 1991 song by Cliff Eidelman from Star Trek VI: The Undiscovered Country
 "Reveal", a 2003 song by Celine Dion from One Heart
 "Revealed", a 2005 song by Blank & Jones and Steve Kilbey from Relax Edition 2
 "Reveal" (Roxette song), a 2006 song by Roxette from Roxette Hits
 "Reveal", a 2011 song by Boom Bip from Zig Zaj
 "The Reveal", a 2017 song by Danny Elfman from Tulip Fever

Periodicals
 Reveal, a magazine published by Nat Mags
 Reveal Magazine, part of the Property Brothers franchise
 The Revealer, an online magazine which reviews religion in the news

Television 
 Revealed (Australian TV program) Australian current affair program
 Revealed (Australian documentary series), an investigative documentary series
 Revealed (UK TV programme), a UK news programme for teenagers
 Revealed, a 2002–2011 UK documentary series, whose performers have included Suzie Kennedy
 Revealed with Jules Asner, a 2001–2003 American biography series
 "Reveal", a 2020 episode of the animated series 12 oz. Mouse

Other uses in arts, entertainment, and media
 Reveal (narrative), in show business and literature, the exposure of a "twist"
 Reveal (podcast), an investigative reporting podcast
 The Revealed, an internet documentary project about gorillas

Other uses
 Reveal (carpentry), a type of joint
 Reveal system, a system of plant classification

See also
 
 Revelation (disambiguation)